Albert Maurice Hackett (February 16, 1900 – March 16, 1995) was an American actor, dramatist and screenwriter most noted for his collaborations with his partner and wife Frances Goodrich.

Early years
Hackett was born in New York City, the son of actress Florence Hackett (née Hart) and Maurice Hackett. He attended Professional Children's School and started out as a child actor, appearing on stage and in films. His brother was actor Raymond Hackett. Their stepfather was the early film actor Arthur V. Johnson, who married their mother Florence around 1910. His sister-in-law was Blanche Sweet, Raymond's second wife.

Career
Hackett acted in many films, including Anne of Green Gables (1919). His Broadway credits as a performer include Mr. and Mrs. North (1941), Up Pops the Devil (1930), Mirrors (1928), Off-Key (1927), Twelve Miles Out (1925), The Nervous Wreck (1923), Up the Ladder (1922), Just a Woman (1914) and The Happy Marriage (1909). His Broadway credits as a writer include The Diary of Anne Frank (1955 and 1997), The Great Big Doorstep (1942), Bridal Wise (1932), Everybody's Welcome (1931) and Up Pops the Devil (1930).

Soon after marrying screenwriter Frances Goodrich, the couple moved to Hollywood in the late 1920s to write the screenplay for their stage success Up Pops the Devil for Paramount Pictures. In 1933, they signed a contract with MGM and remained with the studio until 1939. Among their earliest assignments was writing the screenplay for The Thin Man (1934). They were encouraged by director W. S. Van Dyke to use the writing of Dashiell Hammett as a basis only and to concentrate on providing witty exchanges for the principal characters, Nick and Nora Charles (played by William Powell and Myrna Loy). The resulting film became one of the year's major hits, and the script, considered to show a modern relationship in a realistic manner for the first time, was considered groundbreaking, although it preceded enforcement of the Motion Picture Production Code.

Recognition
The Hacketts received Academy Award for Screenplay nominations for The Thin Man, After the Thin Man (1936), Father of the Bride (1950) and Seven Brides for Seven Brothers (1955). They won Writers Guild of America awards for Easter Parade (1949), Father's Little Dividend (1951), Seven Brides for Seven Brothers (1954) and The Diary of Anne Frank (1959), and were nominated for In the Good Old Summertime (1949), Father of the Bride (1950) and The Long, Long Trailer (1954). They also won a Pulitzer Prize for Drama and the New York Drama Critics' Circle award for their original play The Diary of Anne Frank. Some of their other films include Another Thin Man (1939) and It's a Wonderful Life (1946).

Filmography
{| class="wikitable"
|-
! Year
! Title
! Role
! Notes
|-
|1912|| My Princess  || Davey || Short
|-
|1912|| A College Girl  || TommyJean's Brother || Short
|-
|1912|| In After Years || Little Roy Wilson || Short
|-
|1912|| The Violin's Message || Bennie VaneBlossom's Younger Brother || Short
|-
|1912|| The Wooden Bowl || The Grandson || Short
|-
|1912|| The Spoiled Child || Albert Harroldthe Younger Son || Short
|-
|1912|| Just Pretending || Albert Millsthe Little Boy || Short
|-
|1912|| Two Boys || Albert Manning || Short
|-
|1913|| Annie Rowley's Fortune || Annie's 2nd Brother || Short
|-
|1913|| The School Principal || Tommy Moriarty || Short
|-
|1913|| The Yarn of the 'Nancy Belle''' || Child || Short
|-
|1914|| The Lost Child || The Little Boy || Short
|-
|1914|| Codes of Honor || Robert Bowditch as a boy (uncredited) || Short
|-
|1914|| The Lie || Bobbie Phillipsthe Little Boy || Short
|-
|1914|| A Prince of Peace ||  || Short
|-
|1914|| The House Party || Jack CarstairsSon  || Short
|-
|1915|| Black Fear || George Martindale ||
|-
|1918|| The Venus Model || Boy ||
|-
|1919|| Come Out of the Kitchen || Charles Daingerfield ||
|-
|1919|| The Career of Katherine Bush || Bert Bush ||
|-
|1919|| Anne of Green Gables || Robert ||
|-
|1920|| Away Goes Prudence || Jimmie Ryan ||
|-
|1920|| The Good-Bad Wife || Leigh Carter ||
|-
|1921|| Molly O || Billy O'Dair ||
|-
|1922|| The Country Flapper || Hopp Jumpp ||
|-
|1922|| A Woman's Woman || Kenneth Plummer ||
|-
|1922|| The Darling of the Rich || Fred Winship ||
|-
|1930|| Whoopee! || Chester Underwood ||
|}

References

 
 
 Holmstrom, John. The Moving Picture Boy: An International Encyclopaedia from 1895 to 1995'', Norwich, Michael Russell, 1996, p. 16.

External links

 
 
 

1900 births
1995 deaths
American male screenwriters
Pulitzer Prize for Drama winners
20th-century American dramatists and playwrights
American male dramatists and playwrights
20th-century American male writers
20th-century American male actors
American male stage actors
American male film actors
American male silent film actors
American male child actors
Male actors from New York City
20th-century American screenwriters